Abattoir refers to a slaughterhouse. 

Abattoir may also refer to:

 Abattoir (band), an American speed metal band
 Abattoir (comics), a fictional character in the DC Comics universe
"Abattoir", song by Gehenna from WW
 Abattoir (X Marks the Pedwalk song), a single by X Marks the Pedwalk
 Abattoir (film), a horror film directed by Darren Lynn Bousman